Amanda Longan  (born January 16, 1997) is an American water polo goalkeeper and member of the United States women's national water polo team. She became world champion at the 2017 World Aquatics Championships. She also participated at among others the 2017 Summer Universiade, 2017 FINA Women's Water Polo World League, 2018 FINA Women's Water Polo World Cup, 2019 Pan American Games, and 2019 FINA Women's Water Polo World League. She was part of the gold medal winning US team in the women's water polo tournament at the 2020 Summer Olympics.

References 

1997 births
Living people
American female water polo players
Water polo goalkeepers
Water polo players at the 2020 Summer Olympics
Medalists at the 2020 Summer Olympics
Olympic gold medalists for the United States in water polo
World Aquatics Championships medalists in water polo